Majdanek was a German Nazi concentration camp named after a park near the city of Lublin in eastern Poland.

Majdanek (comes from a suburb of Lublin "Majdan Tatarski") may also refer to:
 Majdanek, Tomaszów Lubelski County, a village in Lublin Voivodeship, eastern Poland
 Majdanek, Zamość County, a village in Lublin Voivodeship, eastern Poland

See also
Majdanpek, village in Serbia